The State Migration Service of the Government of the Kyrgyz Republic is a governmental organization implementing state policy for migration in Kyrgyzstan. Kaymazarov Tashtanbek Turarovich was appointed, starting from 21 October 2020, to become the current Chairman of the State Migration Service.

History 
The service started to function in accordance with the Resolution of the Government of the Kyrgyz Republic No. 854 as of December 11, 2015, “On the Issues of the State Migration Service under the Government of the Kyrgyz Republic”. On December 12, 2016, by Decree No. 653 of the Government of the Kyrgyz Republic, there have been some changes to the functions of the Service.

Structure 
The agency is headed by the Chief of the Service. He has an adviser, an assistant, a commissioner for the prevention of corruption, and a press secretary. The Service has the following departments and employment numbers:  
 Personnel and Document Management Department (5 persons)
 Legal Support and International Cooperation Department (5 persons)
 Financial and Technical Support Department (4 persons)
 Department of Labor Migration of Citizens Abroad (6 persons)
 Department for the Development of Migration policy (5 persons)
 Department for Working with Kairylmans
 Department for Working with Foreign Citizens (6 persons)
 Department for Working with Refugees (4 persons)

References 

Government agencies established in 2015
Government of Kyrgyzstan
Law enforcement in Kyrgyzstan